The Mackenzie River is a river in the South Island of New Zealand.

It is in the Mackenzie Basin of the Canterbury region.  The river feeds into the Grays River which in turn feeds into the Tekapo River.

References

Rivers of Canterbury, New Zealand
Rivers of New Zealand